Jerusalem Township is one of the eleven townships of Lucas County, Ohio, United States. The 2010 census found 3,109 people in the township.

Geography
Located in the far eastern part of the county along the shores of Lake Erie, it borders the following townships and city:
Put-in-Bay Township, Ottawa County - east, across Lake Erie
Carroll Township, Ottawa County - southeast
Benton Township, Ottawa County - south
Allen Township, Ottawa County - southwest
Oregon - west

No municipalities are located in Jerusalem Township, although the unincorporated communities of Bono, Curtice, and Yondota lie in the township's southwest, southwest, and south. The census-designated place of Reno Beach, comprising the communities of Lakemont Landing, Reno Beach, Lakeland, and Howard Farms Beach, occupies the Lake Erie shoreline in the eastern part of the township. West Sister Island, in Lake Erie about 9 miles offshore to the northeast, is also included in the township.

The fake town of Goblu was inserted into the 1978-79 Michigan state map in the township as a joke.

Jerusalem Township is also the home of Crane Creek State Park, the Cedar Point National Wildlife Refuge, and the Ottawa National Wildlife Refuge.

Name and history
It is the only Jerusalem Township statewide.

Government
The township is governed by a three-member board of trustees, who are elected in November of odd-numbered years to a four-year term beginning on the following January 1. Two are elected in the year after the presidential election and one is elected in the year before it. There is also an elected township fiscal officer, who serves a four-year term beginning on April 1 of the year after the election, which is held in November of the year before the presidential election. Vacancies in the fiscal officership or on the board of trustees are filled by the remaining trustees.

Education

Children living in Jerusalem Township are sent to the Oregon City Schools, in Oregon, Ohio. K-4 to Jerusalem Elementary, 5–6 to Eisenhower Intermediate, 7–8 to Fassett Junior High and 9–12 to Clay High School.

References

External links
Township website
County website

Townships in Lucas County, Ohio
Townships in Ohio